Patricia Barbizet (born 17 April 1955) is a French businessperson. She was chief executive officer of Christie's from 2014 to 2016. From 1992 to 2017, she served as executive director of Groupe Artémis.

Early life and education
Barbizet graduated from ESCP Europe in 1976.

Career
Barbizet began her career as an executive assistant with Renault in 1977. She then held the positions of International Treasurer (1979 to 1982) followed by "Group Treasurer" of RVI (Renault Industrial Vehicles, which became Renault Trucks) until 1984, and finally CFO of Renault Crédit International and Director of Renault Acceptance BV from 1984 to 1989.

In 1989, Barbizet joined the Pinault Group as chief financial officer and was appointed deputy director-general for finance and communication of Pinault-CFAO (1990) before becoming managing director of Groupe Artémis. She served as vice president of the board of Kering (formerly Pinault-Printemps-Redoute). From 2014 to 2016, she served as CEO of Christie's after Steven P. Murphy stepped down.

Appointed by Nicolas Sarkozy, Barbizet headed the Investment Committee the Strategic Investment Fund (a subsidiary of the Caisse des Dépôts et Consignations) from 2008 to 2013. In 2017, she was appointed chairwoman of the French High Committee on Corporate Governance (HCGE).

In 2017, Barbizet left Artemis.

Other activities

Corporate boards
 Pernod Ricard, Independent Member of the Board of Directors (since 2019)
 AXA, Independent Member of the Board of Directors (since 2018)
 Total S.A., Independent Member of the Board of Directors (since 2008)
 Groupe PSA, Member of the Board of Directors (2013-2016)
 Air France-KLM, Member of the Board of Directors (2003-2013)
 Bouygues, Member of the Board of Directors (2000-2013)

Non-profit organizations
 Bilderberg Group, Member of the Steering Committee
 France China Foundation, Member of the Strategic Committee
 Paris Europlace, Member of the Board of Directors
 French Association of Corporate Treasurers (AFTE), President (1980–82)
 Former President and CEO of SEFIMEG
 Member of the Financial Markets Authority (CMF) (1996–2002)

Recognition
In November 2012, Barbizet was honored by the international educational organization Humanity in Action. In 2015, she ranked sixth in Fortune Magazine's 50 Most Powerful Women EMEA.

Personal life
Her husband, Jean Barbizet, former president of Barclays Capital France, oversaw the investment division of Barclays.

References 

1955 births
Living people
20th-century French businesswomen
20th-century French businesspeople
21st-century French businesswomen
21st-century French businesspeople
Officiers of the Légion d'honneur
Commanders of the Ordre national du Mérite
ESCP Europe alumni
French women chief executives